Makrygialos or Makrigialos may refer to:

 Makry Gialos, a former municipality in Crete
 Makrygialos, Pieria, a village and former municipal district in northern Greece